Soil Biology and Biochemistry is a monthly peer-reviewed scientific journal that was established in 1969 and is currently published by Elsevier. Its founding editor-in-chief was John Saville Waid. It publishes original research papers that describe and explain biological processes occurring in soil. Since 2020, the editors-in-chief are Karl Ritz (University of Nottingham) and Josh Schimel (University of California Santa Barbara). According to the Journal Citation Reports, the journal has a 2020 impact factor of 7.609.

References

External links

Soil science journals
English-language journals
Publications established in 1969